All I Need is the sixth studio album by the American recording artist Sylvester. The album was praised by the LGBT community media as a return to form, recalling the energy of "You Make Me Feel (Mighty Real)" released four years earlier. The San Francisco Sentinel wrote that the album was "pure pop geared directly for the I-Beam crowd that wants to boogie down for seven cuts." The Bay Area Reporter said the album was "masterful", gushing "Syl doesn't just present music, he  music at its dynamic best." Mainstream music magazine Billboard noted that the album was "his most consistent [and] interesting" since the late 1970s. In a retrospective review, AllMusic assessed the album poorly, writing that Sylvester "was now floundering, with his high-energy brand of disco out of fashion." In 2022, Rolling Stone ranked "Do Ya Wanna Funk" number 179 in their list of 200 Greatest Dance Songs of All Time.  

Physical copies of the single "Do Ya Wanna Funk" listed the song's artist variously as Patrick Cowley, Patrick Cowley featuring Sylvester, or simply Sylvester.  The song peaked at number 4 on the Billboard Dance Club Play chart.  It was also a top 10 hit in a few European markets and a top 40 hit in the UK.   "Don't Stop" (with "All I Need" for some releases) also received significant US Club Play and peaked at number 3 on the Billboard Dance Club Play chart, where "Tell Me" also charted

A massive album release party was held in December 1982 at the former Dreamland nightclub in San Francisco, with Steve Fabus serving as deejay for the packed dance floor.

Track listing

Personnel
Sylvester - lead vocals and backing vocals
Patrick Cowley - synthesizers and sequencer
James Wirrick - synthesizers and drum machine
David Frazier - percussion
The Fabulashes - backing vocals
Wally Winzor - drums on "Tell Me" and "Won't You Let Me Love You"

Charts

References

1982 albums
Sylvester (singer) albums
Post-disco albums